The girls’ javelin throw competition at the 2014 Summer Youth Olympics was held on 22–25 August 2014 in Nanjing Olympic Sports Center.

Schedule

Results

Qualification
First 50% of the athletes from the Qualification round progress to the A Final and the remaining athletes to the B Final.

Finals

Final A

Final B

External links
 iaaf.org - Women's javelin throw
 Nanjing 2014 - Athletics Official Results Book
 

Athletics at the 2014 Summer Youth Olympics